The Dominican Republic national handball team is the national handball team of Dominican Republic and is governed by the Dominican Republic Handball Federation.

The team won the 2009 Pan-American Men’s First Division Championship, held in home soil Santo Domingo.

Tournament record

Pan American Championship

Pan American Games

Central American and Caribbean Games

Caribbean Handball Cup
2013 – 1st

Nor.Ca Championship

Current squad

References

External links

IHF profile

Handball in the Dominican Republic
Men's national handball teams
National sports teams of the Dominican Republic